Bruma is a surname. Notable people with the surname include:

Eddy Bruma (1925–2000), Surinamese politician, lawyer and writer
Jeffrey Bruma (born 1991), Dutch football defender, brother of Marciano
Marciano Bruma (born 1984), Dutch football defender, brother of Jeffrey

See also 

 Bruma (disambiguation)